Brandenburg an der Havel – Potsdam-Mittelmark I – Havelland III – Teltow-Fläming I is an electoral constituency (German: Wahlkreis) represented in the Bundestag. It elects one member via first-past-the-post voting. Under the current constituency numbering system, it is designated as constituency 60. It is located in western Brandenburg, comprising the city of Brandenburg an der Havel, most of the Potsdam-Mittelmark district, and parts of the Havelland and Teltow-Fläming districts.

Brandenburg an der Havel – Potsdam-Mittelmark I – Havelland III – Teltow-Fläming I was created for the inaugural 1990 federal election after German reunification. Since 2021, it has been represented by Sonja Eichwede of the Social Democratic Party (SPD).

Geography
Brandenburg an der Havel – Potsdam-Mittelmark I – Havelland III – Teltow-Fläming I is located in western Brandenburg. As of the 2021 federal election, it comprises the independent city of Brandenburg an der Havel; the entirety of the Potsdam-Mittelmark district excluding the municipalities of Kleinmachnow, Michendorf, Nuthetal, Schwielowsee, Stahnsdorf, and Teltow; the municipalities of Milower Land, Premnitz, and Rathenow from the Havelland district; and the municipalities of Jüterbog and Niedergörsdorf from the Teltow-Fläming district.

History
Brandenburg an der Havel – Potsdam-Mittelmark I – Havelland III – Teltow-Fläming I was created after German reunification in 1990, then known as Brandenburg a.d. Havel – Rathenow – Belzig. It acquired its current name in the 2002 election. In the 1990 through 1998 elections, it was constituency 275 in the numbering system. In the 2002 and 2005 elections, it was number 60. In the 2009 election, it was number 61. Since the 2013 election, it has been number 60.

Originally, the constituency comprised the independent city of Brandenburg an der Havel and the districts of Rathenow and Belzig. It acquired its current configuration in the 2002 election. Upon the abolition of the Groß Kreutz Amt ahead of the 2005 election, the former municipality of Derwitz was transferred out of the constituency. In the 2017 election, it lost the Amt of Nennhausen. In the 2021 election, it gained the municipality of Werder (Havel).

Members
The constituency was first represented by Hans-Hinrich Knaape of the Social Democratic Party (SPD) from 1990 to 1998, followed by Margrit Spielmann from 1998 to 2009. Future President of Germany Frank-Walter Steinmeier served from 2009 to 2017. In 2017, Dietlind Tiemann of the Christian Democratic Union (CDU) was elected as representative. Sonja Eichwede regained the constituency for the SPD in 2021.

Election results

2021 election

2017 election

2013 election

2009 election

References

Federal electoral districts in Brandenburg
Brandenburg an der Havel
Potsdam-Mittelmark
Havelland (district)
Teltow-Fläming
1990 establishments in Germany
Constituencies established in 1990